The Family Holiday Association is a United Kingdom charity, registered charity number 800262. It is the only national charity dedicated to providing seaside breaks and day trips for families struggling with some of the toughest challenges life can bring. The charity provides breaks for UK families struggling with problems such as severe and long-term illness, bereavement, mental health issues, disability and domestic violence.

All the families helped by the charity are referred by someone already working with them in a supporting role and families cannot apply for a break directly. By working with referrers, the Family Holiday Association ensures that the funds raised help the families who will benefit most. The referral network includes teachers, health visitors, social workers and other charities such as Barnardo’s and Shelter.

The Family Holiday Association receives no government funding, and is wholly reliant on the generosity of donors, fundraisers and other supporters.

The charity is chaired by travel journalist and broadcaster Alison Rice, and the charity President is Peter Long, who is Chairman of the Royal Mail and ex Joint Chief Executive of travel company TUI Group.

History 
The Family Holiday Association became a registered national charity in 1975. The charity was started by North London couple Joan and Patrick Laurance, who had experienced first-hand what a difference a break away from home can make. Peter Binns, a school friend of Patrick, lived in Westcliff-on-Sea. He and his wife were planning a trip away and thought that their good friends the Laurances would benefit from a trip to the seaside, particularly as they were going through a difficult time. Joan and Patrick were at this point living in a single room with their daughter, Pamela, who was in poor health. Their second daughter had been born handicapped and, tragically, had died aged just three months. To make matters worse, Patrick had been made redundant. The family desperately needed a break but couldn’t afford to go away.

After returning home, the couple felt refreshed. Happy memories of their family break gave them new hope and the resolve to move forward. This got them to thinking, “Could we help others by providing holidays for families in similar situations?” By the early 1970s, Patrick had become a councillor and was given an allowance for his duties. One of his first ideas was to ask fellow councillors to donate their expenses (as he had) to facilitate the launch of a new charity. According to Joan, “Pat could talk a cat into having puppies,” so it came as no surprise when most agreed.

At the same time, he and Joan wrote to friends and relatives to ask if they would contribute £50, or whatever they could afford. In addition, Joan, who had gained experience and contacts in her work for the Samaritans and Red Cross, wrote to anyone she could think of, including trusts, to ask for help. Before long, the couple had the money they needed, and by 1975 the Family Holiday Association had become registered a national charity.

Soon the Laurances began to feel that they were in a position to write to their local social services department to ask if they knew of any families who might benefit from a holiday. At this time, Joan and Patrick decided that for a family to be awarded a holiday, the family needed to be under stress and not to have had a holiday for three years. The couple were particularly keen that children should be able to see the seaside.

As far as the charity’s message was concerned, they wanted holidays to be seen as a necessity and not a luxury – a key principle of the Family Holiday Association that survives to this day.

Research 
The Family Holiday Association was founded on the principle that spending quality time together as a family away from home results in stronger, healthier and happier families and communities. For the founders Patrick and Joan Laurance, this was based on personal experience. Yet there is also a significant body of academic research that supports the work the charity does

The charity maintains a dedicated online resource – or Knowledge Bank – for social tourism which is hosted on the Holidays Matter website. It documents a range of literature from journal articles, reports, webpages and other sources. The Knowledge Bank is updated regularly to include any new published literature and research.

The charity has helped found the Social Tourism Consortium together with organisations such as the Youth Hostels Association (England & Wales), The Family Fund and UNISON Welfare.  The consortium is responsible for a series of seminars that have been held in both London and Edinburgh. The charity is also a member of BITS the Brussels-based International Bureau of Social Tourism.

Impact 
The charity's family holiday programme runs between Easter and mid-October each year. Families referred by frontline care professionals are helped to access a break away from home during this time, and their holiday usually comprises a day trip or a few days by the British seaside. The charity asks for feedback on the breaks provided, in order to make any necessary adjustments and continually improve their work. Based on this feedback, they produce an Impact Report summary of the holiday season.

2016 Holiday season 
 5,184 families benefitted from a short break or day out - that's 11,222 children and 7,767 adults
 Half the families helped had a break together for the first time
 The charity worked with over 1,000 referrers nationwide from 188 local authority areas
How families benefitted
 99% had fun and created happy memories
 98& of children had new experiences
 96% of families had a chance to spend more time together
 94% were more optimistic
 92% reduced stress and worries
 92% got on better as a family
 91% of families were able to cope better after the break
 87% had more confidence
Issues affecting families*
 61% mental health issues
 34% domestic violence
 32% physical health issues
 15% bereavement
 12% victims of antisocial behaviour and crime
*Most families referred to the charity are facing multiple issues and challenges.

References

External links
 http://www.fhaonline.org.uk

Social welfare charities based in the United Kingdom